The Mangfall is a river of Upper Bavaria, Germany. The Mangfall is the outflow of the Tegernsee lake and discharges in Rosenheim from the left into the Inn.

Towns and villages on the Mangfall 

 Gmund am Tegernsee
 Valley
 Weyarn
 Grub (district of Valley)
 Feldkirchen-Westerham
 Feldolling
 Bruckmühl
  (district of Bruckmühl)
  (district of Bruckmühl)
 Bad Aibling
 Kolbermoor
 Rosenheim

See also
List of rivers of Bavaria

References

External links 

 bike trail along the Mangfall
 Flux of the Mangfall in Rosenheim during the last 30 days

 
Rivers of Bavaria
Miesbach (district)
Rosenheim (district)
Rivers of Germany